Iridium fluoride may refer to:

Iridium(IV) fluoride, IrF4
Iridium(V) fluoride, IrF5
Iridium(VI) fluoride, IrF6, or iridium hexafluoride